The Trans Pennine Trail is a long-distance path running from coast to coast across Northern England entirely on surfaced paths and using only gentle gradients (it runs largely along disused railway lines and canal towpaths). It forms part of European walking route E8 and is part of the National Cycle Network as Route 62 (referencing the M62 motorway which also crosses the Pennines).

Most of the surfaces and gradients make it a relatively easy trail, suitable for cyclists, pushchairs and wheelchair users. The section between Stockport and Barnsley is hilly, especially near Woodhead, and not all sections or barriers are accessible for users of wheelchairs or non-standard cycles. Some parts are also open to horse riding.

The trail is administered from a central office in Barnsley, which is responsible for promotion and allocation of funding. However, the twenty-seven local authorities whose areas the trail runs through are responsible for management of the trail within their boundaries.

History 

The idea originated from Barnsley, where the head office is now based. Work on the trail started in 1999. Early development was boosted by a £5 million investment by the Millennium Commission. The trail was officially opened in September 2001. However, the route was not fully completed until late 2004. It cost £60 million to construct.

Route 

The main west–east trail starts at Southport, then heads south through the suburbs of Liverpool, through Widnes, Warrington, Manchester, Stockport and Hadfield. It then crosses the Peak District, heading up the Longdendale valley via the Longdendale Trail to Woodhead, then down through Dunford Bridge and Penistone, Doncaster, Selby, Hessle, Hull and Hornsea. Between Southport and Selby it is National Cycle Network, Route 62 and from Selby to Hornsea, NCN Route 65.

There is also a north–south trail that runs from Leeds and through Wakefield. It then passes through Barnsley and crosses over the main trail in the Dearne Valley area. After that it continues south to Sheffield and the Rother Valley Country Park before terminating in Chesterfield.

The route also has several deviations and loops in South Yorkshire, including one to Rotherham, NCN Route 6 and NCN Route 627 south of Penistone.  Another  spur runs from Selby to York, NCN Route 65.

The cross-continent European walking route E8 uses the trail between Hull and Liverpool to cross England. It also crosses both the eastern and western routes of the European walking route E2.

Certificates 

Certificates are handed out for covering different parts of the trail. In order to obtain them, trail users need to collect stamps at various points along the trail.

Southport to Hornsea:  
Liverpool to Hull:   
Liverpool to Hornsea:   
Southport to Hull:  
Whole route (including north/south links):

See also  
 Rail trail
 List of recreational walks in Cheshire

References

External links 

 Official Trans-Pennine Trail website
  Trans-Pennine Trail conservation volunteers
 Sustrans Volunteers Sheffield
 View the Pennine Trail North East section on BHS EMAGIN online map

Footpaths in Derbyshire
Buildings and structures celebrating the third millennium
Long-distance footpaths in England
Footpaths in South Yorkshire
Footpaths in Greater Manchester
Footpaths in Cheshire
Pennines